Harry H. Short (April 16, 1878 in Plymouth, Indiana – November 20, 1954 in Garden City, Kansas) was a minor league baseball player and manager. He played on two Texas League championship Austin Senators teams (in 1906 and 1907), and led the league in stolen bases in 1907 with 78.

Playing career
Short grew up in Concordia, Kansas; his younger brother was Clyde Short who would go on to become Chairman of the Kansas Democratic Party.

Harry Short attended Kansas State Normal College and played shortstop on the college team. After subsequently playing on semi-professional teams in Concordia, where he became known for his strong fielding and speed, he entered minor league baseball in 1904 with a team in New Bern, North Carolina. In 1905 he played for the Minneapolis Minnies of the Kansas State League. In 1906, he was recruited by, and played third base (and other positions) for, the Austin Senators, who were part of the South Texas League that year. The 1906 Senators won their league championship by default when the Houston Buffaloes refused to stop using non-league players. He remained with the Senators in 1907, a year in which he led the league in stolen bases with 78 and won another league championship.

During 1907, the Senators would post one of the most lopsided victories in baseball history, by defeating the San Antonio Bronchos in the second game of a doubleheader 44-0. During this game, Short scored seven runs on five hits, stole four bases and hit a double and a triple. He was referred to in articles as "one of the fastest baserunners and best base-stealers in Texas", and was also a fan-favorite that year to take over managing the Senators team.

Short played again for Austin in 1908, then began 1909 with the Houston Buffaloes before being traded to the Waco Navigators for Hub Northen (who would go on to play for the Cincinnati Reds, Brooklyn Dodgers, and St. Louis Browns). In 1910, he left the Texas League for the Central Kansas League, where he became player-manager of the Concordia Travelers. The Travelers won league championships in 1910 and 1911, and during the latter season, the Travelers and Short were accused by the Clay Center Cubs of "throwing games" to the Junction City Soldiers, which was hotly debated in opposing newspapers columns in both towns. After the Central Kansas League folded, he continued to play for local Kansas teams until at least 1915.

Managerial career

Year-by-year managerial record 

During his early career as a player-manager, Short's teams were often referred to as "Short's Boosters" or "Short's Travelers". In his first two managing seasons, he played with and coached Chick Smith and the Travelers won their league championship. After the Central Kansas League folded, Short went on to manage and play for a number of other teams for other baseball leagues throughout Kansas.

References

1878 births
1954 deaths
Minor league baseball managers
Minor league baseball players
People from Plymouth, Indiana
People from Garden City, Kansas
People from Concordia, Kansas
Baseball players from Kansas
Waco Navigators players
Austin Senators players
Houston Buffaloes players
Concordia Travelers players
Minneapolis Minnies (Kansas) players